S Brigid's won the 2003 Dublin Senior Football Championship against Kilmacud Crokes. Brigid's won by 0-17 to 1-08 against.

External links
 Official Dublin Website
 Dublin on Hoganstand
 Dublin Club GAA
 Reservoir Dubs
 Dublin Teams

Dublin Senior Football Championship
Dublin Senior Football Championship